The Battle of Jalalabad occurred in 1710 between the Mughal forces of Jalal Khan and the Sikh forces of Banda Singh Bahadur. Banda Singh Bahadur attacked the Mughal stronghold of Jalalabad. The army opposing Banda Singh was composed of a sizeable number of the Muslim zamindars and shurafa, including many Sadat, Banda Singh Bahadur repelled Mughal and Pathan forces after four days from the battlefield and back into the city, but failed to capture the city and withdrew.

Background
Banda Singh Bahadur was notified that Sikh people were imprisoned and persecuted, and the conditions were extremely bad for the Hindus, facing cruel treatment and tyranny in the city of Jalalabad, ruled by Jalal Khan and Pathan army. Banda Singh sent his messengers to Jalal Khan to stop the oppression against the non-Muslims but his messengers were mistreated and sent back. Therefore, Banda Singh Bahadur marched towards Jalalabad. On the way to Jalalabad, Banda Singh defeated, captured and plundered Sarsawa, Saharanpur, Beyhut, Ambeyta, Nanauta, with half the administrative towns of Saharanpur falling under the Sikh rule. From Nanauta, Banda and his army approached Jalalabad where the army of Jalal Khan awaited them.

Battle and siege
The battle took place for three or four days. Jamal Khan and Pir Khan, the nephews of Jalal Khan, were killed along with Hazbar Khan and numerous Ghazis, resulting in the repulsion of Pathan army back into the city fort. The city was besieged, but due to strong walls of the fort, unpleasant weather that flooded the surrounding of the fort, along with its banks overflowed by river Krishna, and especially after being notified of urgent calls from the Sikhs of central Punjab, appealing for help against their local faujdars, and that the Mughal emperor Bahadur Shah had sent reinforcement to recover the lost territories in Punjab, Banda Singh Bahadur lifted the siege for more urgent matters.

References

Battles involving the Mughal Empire
Sikh warriors
1710 in Asia
1710 in military history